Eupithecia thaica is a moth in the family Geometridae that is endemic to Thailand.

The forewings are brownish ochreous and the hindwings are pale yellowish white.

References

Moths described in 2009
Endemic fauna of Thailand
Moths of Asia
thaica